Juma'at Jantan (born 23 February 1984) is a Singaporean former professional footballer who played as a right back or a right-sided midfielder for S.League club Home United and the Singapore national team. Jantan was seen as a no-nonsense workhorse and was known for his terrific stamina.

Club statistics

International career
He made his international debut against Cambodia on 11 October 2005 and has earned 6 more caps since then.

He was part of the Singapore Under-23 team that took part in the 2007 Southeast Asian Games in Korat, Thailand that won a bronze medal.

He was recalled to the senior squad in March 2016 after a two-year hiatus and went on to make two starts in two games.

Honours

Club
Home United
Singapore Cup: Winners – 2013

International
Singapore
Southeast Asian Games: Bronze Medal – 2007

References

External links
 More info about Jantan
 

fas.org.sg
fourfourtwo.com

1984 births
Living people
Singaporean footballers
Singapore international footballers
Singapore Premier League players
Home United FC players
LionsXII players
Sembawang Rangers FC players
Association football midfielders
Association football defenders
Malaysia Super League players
Young Lions FC players
Singaporean people of Malay descent
Southeast Asian Games bronze medalists for Singapore
Southeast Asian Games medalists in football
Competitors at the 2007 Southeast Asian Games